Anisolabidinae, alternatively known as Carcinophorinae, Gonolabiinae, Placolabidinae, or Titanolabiinae, is a subfamily of earwigs that contains approximately twenty-five genera. Its existence was cited by Srivastava in the book Fauna of India Pt. 2, by Chen & Ma in Fauna Sinica, and by Henrik Steinmann in The Animal Kingdom. Although Steinmann cited the subfamily's name as Carcinophorinae, this is a synonym for the taxon.

Genera
The following genera are included:

Aborolabis
Anisolabella
Anisolabis
Apolabis
Capralabis
Carcinophora
Epilabis
Epilandex
Euborellia
Flexiolabis
Foramenolabis
Gonolabina
Gonolabis
Heterolabis
Indolabis
Metalabis
Mongolabis
Neolabis
Ornatolabis
Paraflexiolabis
Placolabis
Thekalabis
Titanolabis
Zacheria

References

External links
 The Earwig Research Centre's Anisolabidinae database Source for references: type Anisolabidinae in the "subfamily" field and click "search".

Anisolabididae
Dermaptera subfamilies